Yuriy Volodymyrovych Dudnyk (born 26 September 1968) is a Ukrainian professional football coach and a former player.

Club career
He made his debut in the Soviet Second League in 1988 for FC Shakhtar Horlivka. He played 2 games in the 1992–93 UEFA Champions League for PFC CSKA Moscow.

Honours
 Ukrainian Premier League bronze: 1998
 Russian Cup finalist: 1993, 1994 (played in the early stages of the 1993–94 tournament for PFC CSKA Moscow)

References

External links
 Profile on FC Zorya website 
 

1968 births
Living people
Footballers from Luhansk
Soviet footballers
Ukrainian footballers
Association football defenders
Ukrainian expatriate footballers
Ukraine international footballers
FC Dnipro Cherkasy players
SC Tavriya Simferopol players
FC Metalurh Zaporizhzhia players
FC Nyva Vinnytsia players
PFC CSKA Moscow players
FC Karpaty Lviv players
FC Stal Alchevsk players
FC Rostov players
FC Volyn Lutsk players
FC Urartu players
FC Hoverla Uzhhorod players
Expatriate footballers in Armenia
Ukrainian expatriate sportspeople in Armenia
Ukrainian football managers
FC Zorya Luhansk managers
Ukrainian Premier League managers
Expatriate footballers in Russia
Ukrainian expatriate sportspeople in Russia
Armenian Premier League players
Ukrainian Premier League players
Ukrainian First League players
Ukrainian Second League players
Russian Premier League players